Matt Berger (born October 10, 1993) is a Canadian skateboarder, competing in the street discipline. Berger currently resides in Huntington beach, California.

Career
At the 2021 Street Skateboarding World Championships Berger finished in sixth.

In June 2021, Berger was named to Canada's 2020 Olympic team, in the inaugural skateboarding competition. Berger ultimately competed at the Tokyo 2020 Olympics, placing 20th overall.

References

1993 births
Living people
Canadian skateboarders
Olympic skateboarders of Canada
Sportspeople from Kamloops
Skateboarders at the 2020 Summer Olympics